WKCB-FM (107.1 FM) is a radio station broadcasting a classic hits format. Licensed to Hindman, Kentucky, United States.  The station is currently owned by Hindman Broadcasting Corporation and features programming from Fox News Radio.

References

External links

KCB-FM
Hindman, Kentucky